Luciano Pocrnjic (born 4 August 1981) is a retired Argentine professional footballer who played as a goalkeeper for Primera División club Aldosivi.

External links
 BDFA Profile 
 

1981 births
Living people
Argentine footballers
Argentine expatriate footballers
Argentine people of Croatian descent
Association football goalkeepers
Unión de Santa Fe footballers
Newell's Old Boys footballers
San Martín de San Juan footballers
C.D. Antofagasta footballers
Club Atlético Huracán footballers
Aldosivi footballers
Argentine Primera División players
Argentine expatriate sportspeople in Chile
Expatriate footballers in Chile
Footballers from Santa Fe, Argentina